Clear Lake is a lake in North Cottonwood, Township, Brown County, Minnesota, in the United States. It is a protected public lake.

History
The lake is a sport fishing lake which has been stocked with Fingerlings from a fishery.

In 2019 Clear lake was filmed for a television show called "Fishing the Midwest".

See also
 List of lakes of Minnesota
List of fishes of Minnesota

References

External links
Clear Lake Topographical map

Lakes of Minnesota
Lakes of Brown County, Minnesota